The Classic Athletic Conference was a short-lived IHSAA-sanctioned conference based in northern East Central Indiana. Formed by the largest schools in their predecessor conferences, the conference only lasted nine years before disbanding

History
The conference began in 1977, as schools from both the Mississinewa Valley Conference and White River Conference joined together. This move was spurred by the then-new class football playoff system, where larger schools were awarded fewer points for playing small schools, hurting their chances of a playoff spot. Both conferences had large enrollment disparities, which did not benefit the larger schools. This prompted three schools from each conference to start their own conference. This would cause the end of both existing conferences. The MVC was only a five-member conference at this point, and the a plan for the five remaining WRC schools to join with three schools from the Big Blue River and Mid-Eastern conferences fell through, so the seven schools ended up having to fend for themselves.

The newly formed conference only lasted in its original format for two years, as Mississinewa left for the more geographically-compact Central Indiana Athletic Conference. The remaining five schools continued their tenuous alliance, although the same reason the conference formed (attendance disparities) plagued it through the rest of its existence. Anderson Highland and Jay County remained large schools, while their counterparts' numbers had either stagnated or declined. The end finally came in 1986, when the two aforementioned schools joined the Olympic Conference, which not only had more similar-sized schools, but also featured similar demographics at that point (second/third schools in large cities and mid-sized city schools). Delta, Pendleton Heights, and Yorktown became independents, but worked towards resurrecting the WRC, which was achieved in 1989. The same three schools now play in the Hoosier Heritage Conference.

Former members

References

Indiana high school athletic conferences
High school sports conferences and leagues in the United States
Indiana High School Athletic Association disestablished conferences